Collège Montmorency is a public college in Chomedey, Laval, Quebec, Canada, near the Montmorency Metro station. As of 2015, there were over 7,000 full-time students enrolled.

History
In 1967, several institutions were merged and became public ones, when the Quebec system of public colleges was created. Despite Laval being the third largest city of Quebec with a population of nearly 400,000 inhabitants, Montmorency is its only college. It was founded on November 5, 1969.

Programs

The college offers two types of programs: pre-university and technical. The pre-university programs, which take two years to complete, cover the subject matters which roughly correspond to the additional year of high school given elsewhere in Canada in preparation for a chosen field in university plus a first year of university. (Thus why undergraduates degrees in Quebec are three years rather than four, except for engineering) The technical programs, which take three-years to complete, applies to students who wish to pursue a skill trade. In addition Continuing education and services to business are provided.

Pre-university programs
 Science
 Health science
 Pure and applied science
 Social science
 Organisation administration
 World and society: the major challenges (optional mathematics)
 Glance at the individual
 Arts and letters
 Communication
 Cinema
 Literature
 Languages, culture, and traduction
 Dance
 Visual arts

Usually, pre-university programs require four semesters (two years) to complete. Students can then pursue further studies at university in a field related to their DEC.

Double diploma programs
 Health science and World and society: the major challenges (optional mathematics)
 Pure and applied science and World and society: the major challenges (optional mathematics)
 Health science and visual arts
 Pure and applied science and visual arts
 Health science and dance
 Pure and applied science and dance
 Visual arts and Organization administration
 Visual arts and Glance at the individual
 Visual arts and World and society: the major challenges (optional mathematics)
 Dance and Organization administration
 Dance and Glance at the individual
 Dance and World and society: the major challenges (optional mathematics)

Usually, double diploma programs require six semesters (three years) to complete.

Technical/Career programs
 Biological programs
 Nursing
 Nutrition technology
 Physical rehabilitation technology
 Orthotic and orthopedic prosthesis technology
 Agribusimess programs: 
 Marketing landscape and ornamental horticulture technology
 Physics programs:
 Architectural technology
 Civil engineering technology
 Building assessment and evaluation technology
 Electronics technology
 Industrial electronics technology
 Human programs:
 Firefighting technology
 Children education technology
 Administration programs:
 Administration and accounting technology
 Insurance and financial service council
 Business administration
 Desktop publishing and hypermedia
 Tourisme technology
 Computer science technology
 Managing a food service establishment
 Arts programs:
 Museology techniques

Usually, technical and career programs require six semesters (three years) to complete. Following the completion of their diploma, students can go on the job market or pursue further studies in university in a field related to their diploma.

Athletics
Montmorency's basketball team is among the best in all Canada. The men and women team won many medals in the national championship. In 2006, both teams won the gold medal in the national championship, the boys team winning after trailing by 19 points at the half against the home team of the tournament.

Drama
It is also known for its improvisation league, the MIM (Mouvement d'Improvisation de Montmorency - Montmorency Improvisation Movement), founded in the seventies, from which emerged a number of largely known (in Quebec) comedians and humorists such as Michel Courtemanche, Réal Bossé or Claude Legault.

See also
 List of colleges in Quebec
 Higher education in Quebec
 Canadian Interuniversity Sport
 Canadian government scientific research organizations
 Canadian university scientific research organizations
 Canadian industrial research and development organizations

References

External links
 Collège Montmorency's official website (fr)

Montmorency
Education in Laval, Quebec
Buildings and structures in Laval, Quebec